The Alexander and Busey Houses, located at 106 and 112 5th Avenue, West, in Kalispell, Montana, were listed on the National Register of Historic Places in 1994.

John Gus Thompson, a pitcher for the Pittsburgh Pirates in the first, 1903, World Series lived in the Alexander House in 1910.

The Busey House, at number 106, has been demolished and a replacement building on the site was under construction in 2017.

References

External links
Alexander and Busey Houses, at Montana Historical Society's Digital Vault

Houses on the National Register of Historic Places in Montana
Queen Anne architecture in Montana
Houses completed in 1905
National Register of Historic Places in Flathead County, Montana
1905 establishments in Montana
Houses in Flathead County, Montana
Kalispell, Montana